The acronym CSDMS can refer to:

 The Community Surface Dynamics Modeling System, a NSF-funded project to numerically model Earth-surface processes
 The Centre for Science, Development and Media Studies, a non-governmental organization in India
 The Canadian Society of Diagnostic Medical Sonographers